Levi Petrus Borgstrom (7 November 1919 – 25 July 2001) was a Swedish-New Zealand carver.

Early life
Borgstrom was born in Lycksele, Sweden in 1919. As a teenager, he began using his father's tools to carve wooden cutlery and crockery and was strongly influenced by Saami and Norrland settler culture. His career was largely focused upon spoon carving.

Career
In 1951, he moved to New Zealand and began incorporating New Zealand resources into his Scandinavian-influenced works. He used New Zealand and introduced timbers in his works, including kowhai, tanekaha, akeake, rewarewa, manuka, macrocarpa, cherry wood, privet, mangrove, and silky oak.

Borgstrom worked by drawing a design on a piece of wood and roughly creating the shape using a Scandinavian bow saw. He would then use knives and chisels to further refine the carving, followed by work with files and rasps. The final stages of creating a spoon included sanding, waxing and oiling.

Collections
His work is held in the collection of the Auckland War Memorial Museum and the Powerhouse Museum in Sydney, Australia.

References

1919 births
2001 deaths
Swedish emigrants to New Zealand
New Zealand carvers
People from Lycksele Municipality